is a Japanese manga series written and illustrated by Tomajirō Hoshi. It is a spin-off to the original anime series Code Geass. The manga was serialized in Kodansha's seinen manga magazine Young Magazine the 3rd from November 2014 to October 2015, with its chapters collected in two wideban volumes.

Publication
Written and illustrated by Tomajirō Hoshi, Code Black: Hayabiki no Lelouch was serialized in Kodansha's seinen manga magazine Young Magazine the 3rd from November 6, 2014, to October 6, 2015. Kodansha collected its chapters in two wideban volumes, released on June 5 and December 4, 2015.

Volume list

References

External links
 

Code Geass
Comedy anime and manga
Kodansha manga
Music in anime and manga
Seinen manga